German submarine U-736 was a Type VIIC U-boat of Nazi Germany's Kriegsmarine built for service during World War II. Her keel was laid down on 29 November 1941 by Schichau-Werke of Danzig. She was commissioned on 16 January 1943 with Oberleutnant zur See Reinhard Reff in command.

Design
German Type VIIC submarines were preceded by the shorter Type VIIB submarines. U-736 had a displacement of  when at the surface and  while submerged. She had two shafts and two  propellers.

U-736 was fitted with five  torpedo tubes (four fitted at the bow and one at the stern), fourteen torpedoes, one  SK C/35 naval gun, 220 rounds, and two twin  C/30 anti-aircraft guns. The boat had a complement of between forty-four and sixty.

Service history
U-736 was severely damaged on 24 May 1944 by a Consolidated Liberator from No. 224 Squadron RAF, aircraft letter 'C', and then shot down a British Vickers Wellington aircraft.

Fate

The U-boat captain, Oberleutnant zur See Reinhard Reff, had fired a torpedo at HMS Loch Killin and the periscope was spotted by a port lookout. Action stations rang out through the ship and depth charges shot out in record time. The torpedo was destroyed by the explosion, which was so violent that it forced the damaged U-736 to surface under the stern of the frigate. For a few minutes both vessel were locked together and the survivors of the crew scrambled onto the quarter-deck of Loch Killin to the bewilderment of the frigate's crew. Then U-736 slipped away taking the other crew members to the bottom. The prisoners were disembarked to another warship returning to England and Loch Killin continued on patrol.

References

Bibliography

External links

German Type VIIC submarines
World War II submarines of Germany
Shipwrecks in the Bay of Biscay
World War II shipwrecks in the Atlantic Ocean
U-boats sunk by depth charges
U-boats sunk in 1944
1943 ships
U-boats sunk by British warships
Ships built in Danzig
Ships built by Schichau
Maritime incidents in August 1944